Mother of Apostles (Ukrainian: Мати Апостолів) is a Ukrainian war drama directed by Zaza Buadze.

History
The tragedy of war is shown through the story of one person - MOTHER. Before the viewer's eyes, a complete picture of the tragedy brought by war appears. The formerly prosperous region has turned into ruins not only of cities and villages, but what is much worse — into ruins of body and soul.

Awards

References

2020 films
Ukrainian war films
War in Donbas films